Stillwater is a 19th-century ghost town of Churchill County, Nevada. Stillwater became the county seat of Churchill County in 1868, when the town was an important mail stage stop. In 1903 the seat of government moved to Fallon, Nevada.

In July 1862, a station of the Central Overland California and Pikes Peak Express Company was established in Churchill County. Its name was derived from the Stillwater Slough which was a deep sluggish waterway.  Settlers began arriving in the fall of 1862 and the spring of 1863, and the town of Stillwater grew up around the station. It became the county seat in December 1868, at which time the population of Stillwater was about 150. The county seat and courthouse were moved to Fallon in 1902, and the decline of Stillwater was hastened, although the population was listed as 420 as late as 1940.  The Stillwater National Wildlife Refuge was established in 1949. Stillwater was a Pony Express Stop.

References

Gallery

External links
 Stillwater  at GhostTowns.com

Ghost towns in Churchill County, Nevada
Pony Express stations
Ghost towns in Nevada